Alanites is a genus of extinct Triassic ammonoid cephalopods named by Shevyrev, 1968, found in association with Laboceras and Megaphyllites in Siberia and  assigned to the ceratitid family Khvlaynitidae which is part of the Dinaritaceae. Its  type is Alanites visendus .

References 

 Paleobiology Database -Alanites

Dinaritoidea
Ceratitida genera